The women's long jump event  at the 1976 European Athletics Indoor Championships was held on 22 February in Munich.

Results

References

Long jump at the European Athletics Indoor Championships
Long
Euro